Vroman's Bookstore is reportedly the oldest and largest independent bookstore in Southern California.

The store hosts over 400 free community events a year including children's storytimes, trivia nights, craft classes, bake-offs, and launch parties, and has hosted such authors as President Bill Clinton, President Jimmy Carter, Irving Stone, Upton Sinclair, Ray Bradbury, David Sedaris, Salman Rushdie, Walter Mosley, Joan Didion, Barbara Walters, Anne Rice, Neil Gaiman, Justice Sonia Sotomayor, and Bernie Sanders.

Background
Founded in 1894 by Adam Clark Vroman, the original Vroman's Book and Photographic Supply store was located at 60 E. Colorado St in Pasadena, California. Mr. Vroman loved books and loved giving back to his community. Mr. Vroman was also a passionate photographer, specializing in scenes of the American West and his portraits of Native Americans. When Mr. Vroman died in 1916, he left the bookstore to long-time employees.

During World War II, Vroman's donated and delivered books to Japanese Americans interned at nearby camps, such as the Manzanar camp in Owens Valley.

In 2008, Vroman's was named Bookseller of the Year by Publishers Weekly, an international news magazine of book publishing.

In 2009, Vroman's bought another beloved independent bookstore, Book Soup in West Hollywood, after its owner died and the store was in danger of closing.

In 2020, Vroman's Bookstore itself was in danger of closing due to a significant drop in sales resulting from the Covid-19 pandemic.

References

External links 
 

Bookstores in California
Independent bookstores of the United States
Companies based in Pasadena, California
Companies based in Los Angeles County, California
American companies established in 1894
Retail companies established in 1894
1894 establishments in California
Bookstores established in the 19th century